William Wilson (born c. 1912, date of death unknown) was an Australian cricketer. He played one first-class cricket match for Victoria in 1936.

See also
 List of Victoria first-class cricketers

References

External links

1910s births
Year of death missing
Australian cricketers
Victoria cricketers
Cricketers from Melbourne